Cham-e Sohrab Khani (also Romanized as Cham-e Sohrāb Khānī; also known as Cham Sohrāb and Sohrābkhānī) is a village in Kamfiruz-e Shomali Rural District, Kamfiruz District, Marvdasht County, Fars Province, Iran. At the 2006 census, its population was 271, in 61 families.

References 

Populated places in Marvdasht County